Babble may refer to:

 Babble (That Petrol Emotion album), 1987 album by That Petrol Emotion
 Babble (Coyne & Krause album), 1979 album by Kevin Coyne And Dagmar Krause
 Babble (band), a later incarnation of the Thompson Twins
 Babble (company), a British internet technology company
 Babble.net, a former British internet telephony service
 Babbling, a stage in child language acquisition
 Babble.com, online magazine

See also 
 
 
 Babel (disambiguation)
 Babbel, an online language learning platform
 Babol, a city in Iran
 Bable, an alternative name of the Asturian language of Spain